Metallostichodes vinaceella is a species of snout moth. It is found in Syria and Turkey.

References

Moths described in 1895
Phycitini
Insects of Turkey